Milan Hilderink (born 29 September 2002) is a Dutch professional footballer who plays as a centre-back for Eerste Divisie club TOP Oss, on loan from De Graafschap.

Club career

In 2019, Hilderink signed a two-year professional contract with De Graafschap. He made his professional debut on 23 August 2019 in the match against FC Volendam after replacing Gregor Breinburg in the 83rd minute.

Hilderink signed another contract extension in August 2021, keeping him part of De Graafschap until 2023.

On 21 June 2022, Hilderink was sent on a one-season loan to league rivals TOP Oss.

References

Living people
2002 births
Dutch footballers
People from Bronckhorst
Footballers from Gelderland
Association football defenders
Eerste Divisie players
De Graafschap players
TOP Oss players